A Wicked Ghost III: The Possession is a 2002 Hong Kong horror film produced by Stanley Tong, directed by Hung Chung-hap and starring Gigi Lai, Cheung Tat-ming, Grace Lam, Yip Sai Wing, Wayne Lai, Patrick Keung, Jenny Yam and Joyce Han. It is preceded by A Wicked Ghost in 1999 and A Wicked Ghost II: The Fear in 2000.

Plot
May, a film producer's assistant, finds a spirit tablet in an outdoor filming location. She takes it with her to prevent it from being damaged, but strange things start happening to her friends. They either die or sustain serious injuries. Eventually, she realises that there is a vengeful spirit attached to the tablet and it is leading her towards death in order to complete its desire when it was still alive.

Cast
Gigi Lai as Catherine / Ding-dong Taoist
Cheung Tat-ming as Bibi
Grace Lam as May
Yip Sai Wing as Tom Cool
Wayne Lai as Leung Kam-chung
Patrick Keung as Wong Chou-shui
Jenny Yam as Fiona
Joyce Han as Dazy

External links
 
 

2002 films
Hong Kong supernatural horror films
2000s Cantonese-language films
2002 horror films
2000s Hong Kong films